Edward Henry Carroll Long (September 28, 1808 – October 16, 1865) was a farmer, a lawyer, an American politician and a U.S. Representative from Maryland.

Biography
Born in Princess Anne, Maryland, Long was the son of Zadock and Leah Whittington Long; attended the common schools and graduated from Yale College in 1828.  He studied law, was admitted to the bar in 1830, and commenced practice in Princess Anne.  He was also engaged in agricultural pursuits. He married Amelia Roach and they had five children.

Career
Long was a member of the Maryland House of Delegates from 1833 to 1835, 1839, 1844, and 1861.  He served in the Maryland State Senate in 1860.

Elected from the sixth district of Maryland as a Whig to the Twenty-ninth Congress, Long served from March 4, 1845, to March 3, 1847.  He was not a candidate for renomination in 1846, and resumed the practice of his profession and also engaged in agricultural pursuits on his family farm, "Catalpa".  He was an unsuccessful candidate for election to the United States Senate in 1860.

Death
Long died in Princess Anne, Maryland, on October 16, 1865. He is interred at the Catalpa Family Farm, Princess Anne, Somerset County, Maryland.

References

External links

1808 births
1865 deaths
Yale College alumni
Maryland state senators
Members of the Maryland House of Delegates
People from Princess Anne, Maryland
Whig Party members of the United States House of Representatives from Maryland
19th-century American politicians